The 2018 Asian Taekwondo Championships were the 23rd edition of the Asian Taekwondo Championships, and was scheduled from May 26 to 28, 2018 in Phú Thọ Indoor Stadium, Ho Chi Minh City, Vietnam.

Medal summary

Men

Women

Medal table

Team ranking

Men

Women

References

External links
Asian Taekwondo Union

Asian Championships
Asian Taekwondo Championships
Asian Taekwondo Championships
Asian Taekwondo Championships, 2018